The former Victorian Railways, the state railway authority in Victoria, Australia, built a number of experimental   narrow-gauge lines around the beginning of the 20th century.  Although all were closed by the early 1960s, parts of two have been reopened as heritage railways.

Background 
A depression in the early 1890s brought a halt to the rapid expansion of railways in Victoria. Politicians promoted narrow-gauge lines as a way to link remote communities, particularly in hilly country, without the expense of the  railways. Railway officials opposed them, citing the inconvenience and expense of a break-of-gauge.

The Parliamentary Standing Committee on Railways examined 14 regions for potential railways:
 Bass River District: Without recommending a specific route, the Committee considered a narrow gauge line through the Bass River district to exploit timber resources along the river, coal deposits around Kilcunda and farming around Wonthaggi, eventually recommending examination a low cost broad gauge option. Instead the Wonthaggi railway line was built as broad gauge in 1910.
 Beech Forest District: From Colac to Beech Forest.
 Carrajung District: From Traralgon to Alberton via Carrajung.
 Gembrook District: From Ferntree Gully to Gembrook.
 Gunbower and Cohuna District: From Rochester or Elmore to Gunbower or Cohuna. Instead the Cohuna railway line was  built as broad gauge in 1915.
 King River District: From Wangaratta to Whitfield.
 McDonald's Track District: From Nyora or Monomeith to Thorpdale. The broad gauge Strzelecki railway line partly covered this district in 1922.
 Mitta Mitta River District: From Tallangatta to Eskdale.
 Moondarra and Walhalla District: From Moe to Walhalla.
 Orbost and Snowy River District: An isolated line from Cunninghame to Orbost as an alternative to proposed extension of the broad gauge Gippsland line from Bairnsdale to Orbost via Bruthen. Instead the broad gauge line was extended to Orbost in 1916.
 Poowong East District: From Drouin or Warragul to Korumburra via Poowong.
 Tolmie District: The Committee stated that the suggested line to Whitfield must, at some future time, be extended to Tolmie and Mansfield.
 Upper Murray District: Tallangatta to Cudgwea and Towong, or from Bethanga to Walwa. Instead the broad gauge railway from Tallangatta was extended to Cudgewa between 1916 and 1921.
 Wandin and Warburton District: From Croydon to Warburton.

In considering the McDonald's Track and Poowong East Districts together, the committee also examined shorter routes from the existing Thorpdale railway line and Mirboo North railway line to Leongatha.

The Committee recommended that four experimental lines be built. They were:
 Croydon to Warburton 
 Wangaratta to Whitfield
 Upper Ferntree Gully to Gembrook
 Colac to Beech Forest

The Warburton line was built in broad gauge, however authority was given for the construction of the other three lines. Subsequently, a further two lines were built, the Moe to Walhalla line, and an extension from Beech Forest to Crowes. 

Initial plans were for the railways to be constructed in  gauge, but following correspondence with British railway engineer Everard Calthrop, amongst others, a change was made to  gauge.

None of the lines constructed ever made a profit. Freight rates were the same for broad and narrow-gauge railways, despite higher direct costs. Most of the loadings were goods such as timber, potatoes and lime, which were charged at a low rate. Most freight was outbound, so many trains travelled towards the terminals almost empty. And despite originating the traffic, the lines were only credited with a portion of the freight charge. The amount credited to the lines did not cover the cost of running trains, and the more traffic the larger the loss. However, particularly in the 1920s, the traffic generated by the narrow-gauge lines was appreciated by the railways and the lines survived for up to 60 years before closure.

Right of way and safeworking

A number of studies were made of overseas narrow-gauge railways such as the Darjeeling Himalayan Railway in India and the Ffestiniog Railway in Wales. An initial decision to build the lines in  gauge was changed to  gauge for the Victorian lines. This gauge was being adopted on other lines in the British Empire at this time, such as the Kalka-Shimla Railway and the Sierra Leone Government Railway. The railways were constructed using  rail, initially obtained from broad-gauge lines that were being upgraded. A maximum grade of 1 in 30 (3.33%) was adopted, while the minimum radius of curves was 2 chains i.e. .

Apart from a couple of experiments with other systems, all lines were operated by the Staff and Ticket method of safeworking, as was standard Victorian Railways practice for this system.

Locomotives and rolling stock 

Seventeen  locomotives and two Garratt locomotives, plus a range of passenger and goods vehicles, were built to operate on the narrow-gauge lines. Six of the locomotives, including one of the Garratt locomotives, as well as at least one example of each type of rolling stock, have been restored to working order on the Puffing Billy Railway.

Apart from light maintenance that could be done locally, the locomotives and rolling stock were maintained at the Victorian Railways' Newport Workshops in the suburbs of Melbourne, requiring the transport of the vehicles by broad-gauge flat wagons.  The locomotives and other vehicles would be moved around the various narrow-gauge lines as appropriate, so that no equipment was dedicated to particular lines. However the G class Garratts were only used on the Crowes and Walhalla lines, while the NBH excursion coaches remained on the Gembrook line while that line was in operation.

Parameters 
The trains were all fitted with Westinghouse air brakes and, originally, with chopper couplers. In the mid-1920s the couplers were replaced with small MCB, or "knuckle" couplers.

Locomotives 

Baldwin Locomotive Works in the United States supplied the first two  locomotives, as well as parts for a further two locos.  One each of the supplied locos and the parts kits was a simple loco, and the other a compound. The new class was classed "A", however confusion with the broad-gauge A, AA and A2 classes led to them being referred to as narrow-gauge A class for a short while, with a prefix "N" being applied to written records, making it the NA class. Victorian Railways' Newport Workshops assembled the parts to give an additional two locos, and subsequently built a further 13 of the simple cylinder version. The last one, number 17, was built in 1915.

Nos. 6, 7, 8, 12, and 14 have been restored and operate on the Puffing Billy Railway, and No. 3 is also on the Puffing Billy Railway, awaiting eventual restoration. The remaining locomotives have all been scrapped.

By the mid-1920s, traffic was growing with up to 7 trains a day on the Beech Forest line. To decrease train mileage and therefore costs, two G class Garratt locomotives were purchased from Beyer, Peacock & Company in England. They were designated as the "G" class and given the numbers 41 and 42, and entered service in 1926. G41 spent its entire life on the Crowes line, whilst G42 was originally allocated to the Walhalla line, then transferred to the Crowes line, and is currently running on the Puffing Billy Railway. G41 was scrapped, after having been extensively cannibalised for parts to keep G42 running in the last years of the Crowes line.

Rolling stock 

A range of passenger and goods vehicles  were also built at Newport or by contractors. While most Victorian Railways broad-gauge goods vehicles of the time were 4 wheel trucks, all the narrow-gauge rolling stock were bogie vehicles and most were built on a standard underframe.

Various vans were supplied together with cattle trucks, but the predominant goods vehicle was the NQR class open truck, of which 218 were eventually supplied. Later some  side opening carriages were built to cope with increasing traffic. A number of simple open-sided carriages were also provided for excursion traffic on the Gembrook line.

Lines

Wangaratta to Whitfield 

The first line, from Wangaratta to Whitfield, was unlike the other lines in that it was built through mostly flat, open, agricultural country, following the King River. The  line was built as a narrow-gauge line because it was thought that it might be extended into the mountainous country to the south, but this extension never happened. The line was opened in March 1899, and was the first line to close, in October 1953. The line relied mostly on local agricultural traffic, and opened with a daily mixed train. By the 1930s this had been reduced to a weekly goods service, and stayed at this level until the railway closed. There was only one lineside industry, a dairy at Moyhu, and the majority of stations were nameboards at road crossings.

List of stations 
Wangaratta (Junction station with broad gauge.)
Targoora
Laceby
Oxley
Skehan
Docker
Byrne
Moyhu
Angleside
Claremont
Dwyer
Edi
Hyem
King Valley
Jarrott
Pieper
Whitfield

Upper Ferntree Gully to Gembrook 

The  Gembrook line, running through the southern foothills of the Dandenong Ranges, just east of Melbourne, opened on 18 December 1900. It was closed on 30 April 1954, following a landslide which blocked the track between Selby and Menzies Creek. However, the Puffing Billy Preservation Society was formed in 1955 and, with the co-operation of the Victorian Railways, began to operate tourist services over the remaining usable section of the line between Upper Ferntree Gully and Belgrave stations.

Those services came to an end in 1958 when the line was closed to allow conversion of the track to a broad-gauge electric line, as an extension of the suburban railway system of Melbourne. Through the efforts of the Puffing Billy Preservation Society, the landslide was bypassed, and the remainder of the narrow-gauge line from Belgrave to Gembrook was progressively restored, with trains on the line operating daily for tourists. The railway is now administered by the Emerald Tourist Railway Board.

The Gembrook line always had a much higher passenger loading than the other narrow-gauge lines. The break-of-gauge station of Upper Ferntree Gully was a terminus for Melbourne suburban electric trains, so the line was popular with day-trippers and weekend visitors from Melbourne. Fifteen special excursion carriages, classed NBH, were built to cater for the tourist traffic. Travelling through a region with rich soils and high rainfall, agricultural products such as potatoes formed much of the freight traffic. Over the years, Nobelius Nurseries dispatched thousands of fruit trees from a packing shed located on the company's own siding between Emerald and Nobelius stations. Sawn timber was also an important item of freight, and sidings were located at Gembrook to serve several private  and  gauge tramways that brought the timber down from the surrounding hills.

List of stations 
Upper Ferntree Gully (Junction station with broad gauge.)
Upwey
Tecoma
Belgrave
Selby
Menzies Creek
Clematis
Emerald
Nobelius
Lakeside (Emerald Lake)
Wright
Cockatoo
Fielder
Gembrook

Colac to Beech Forest and Crowes 

The third line to open was in the Otway Ranges in southwest Victoria. The line from Colac to Beech Forest opened in March 1902, and it was extended to Crowes in June 1911. It was also the last to close, finally succumbing in June 1962, although the line had been truncated in 1954.

Both the Colac and Crowes lines entered Beech Forest yard from the same end, creating a junction. Trains had to be turned to run down the Crowes branch and a balloon loop was provided at the other end of the yard. A tennis court occupied the land within the loop. Crowes, the terminus of the line, was the most southerly railway station on the Australian mainland.

The primary traffic was sawn timber and firewood, with many sawmills located adjacent to the railway, or accessed by short tramways. Seasonally heavy potato traffic and a lime kiln added to revenue. Traffic grew to require up to 7 trains a day each way by the mid-1920s. The introduction of the Garratt locomotive allowed a new timetable with two trains each way between Colac and Beech Forest, and a third train each way to Gellibrand. The Crowes branch saw a single mixed train daily. The arrival of the Great Depression and competition from motor vehicles saw traffic decline to a point where only one train each way operated over the line three days a week. Increased wartime loadings saw traffic increase to two trains each way daily, however this improvement was only temporary. By the time the railway closed, the timetable listed only one train each way a week, and most of the traffic was pulpwood.

The line opened using the Staff and Ticket method of safeworking. However Train Section Orders were adopted between 1927 and 1939, after which Staff and Ticket working was resumed.

List of stations 
Colac (Junction station with broad gauge)
Eliminyt
Tulloh
Coram
Barongarook
Birnam
Kawarren
Lovat
Gellibrand
Banool
Wimba
Dinmont
Ditchley
Beech Forest (Terminus until 1911)
Buchanan
Ferguson
Weeaproinah (Terminus from 1955)
Kincaid
Wyelangta
Stalker
Macknott
Lavers Hill
Crowes

Moe to Walhalla 

The last of the narrow-gauge lines to open was the  line to the gold mining town of Walhalla, in 1910. Walhalla had a history of gold mining dating back to the 1870s, and was one of the largest towns in Gippsland. Local residents had long lobbied for a railway, as all goods had to be brought in by bullock cart over rough terrain. However, the gold mine in Walhalla closed in 1914, and the town quickly fell into steep decline. It was reputed that the major source of traffic from Walhalla were the houses of residents leaving the town.

The line did pick up significant traffic from sawmills in the area, some of which had their own sidings. A connection was made with the Tyers Valley Tramway at Collins siding, between Watson and Erica. While the tramway used the same gauge as the railway, there was no physical connection, timber being transhipped by hand. A temporary connection had to be put in place to move locomotives to and from the tramway. A small copper mine and two lime kilns near Platina provided additional traffic. A series of "Back to Walhalla" days in the 1930s caused the railways to put on special passenger trains for these occasions, and such was the demand some were double-headed.

The line was truncated to Platina in 1944 then to Erica in 1952, before finally closing in 1954. The section of the line from Thomson to Walhalla has been rebuilt and now operates as the Walhalla Goldfields Railway.

List of stations 
Moe (Junction station with broad gauge.)
Gooding
Temporary Station Site
Tyers River
Gould
Moondarra
Watson
Erica (Terminus from 1952)
Murie
Platina (Terminus from 1944)
Thomson (Temporary terminus, closed with opening of Walhalla)
Walhalla

Welshpool to Port Welshpool horse-drawn tram
Unlike the other lines, the  line connecting Welshpool and Port Welshpool was operated as a horse-drawn tramway, and had very little in common with the other lines. This line, also known as the Welshpool Jetty line, was opened in 1905 and closed in 1941.

References 

 Houghton, Norman 1992 The Beechy Light Railway Research Society of Australia, Melbourne 
 Cuffley, Peter 1987 That Little Train The Five Mile Press, Fitzroy 
 various 1980 G42 Puffing Billy's Big Brother Puffing Billy Preservation Society 
 Watson, Stephen 1980 Rails to Walhalla Part 1 Stephen Watson 
 Thompson, John 2002 Focus on Victoria's Narrow Gauge Whitfield Line Puffing Billy Preservation Society

External links 
 Victorian Government Narrow Gauge Railways
 Government Railways of less than  gauge

Rolling stock:
 Overview of the narrow-gauge rolling stock classification system
 Images of preserved rolling stock at Puffing Billy

Victorian Railways carriages
 
Rail transport in Victoria (Australia)